Dinesh Chandra is a leader of the Bahujan Samaj Party in Uttar Pradesh. On 10 June 2016, he was elected to the Uttar Pradesh Legislative Council.

References

Year of birth missing (living people)
Living people
Bahujan Samaj Party politicians from Uttar Pradesh